Urho Vaakanainen (born 1 January 1999) is a Finnish professional ice hockey defenceman for the  Anaheim Ducks of the National Hockey League (NHL). He was selected 18th overall by the Bruins in the 2017 NHL Entry Draft.

Playing career
Vaakanainen played as a youth in his native Finland with the Espoo Blues. He made his professional debut with the Espoo Blues in the Liiga during the 2015–16 season, contributing with 6 points in 25 games. On 28 April 2016, Vaakanainen signed a one-year deal with hometown club, JYP Jyväskylä.

Vaakanainen earned a regular role within the JYP Jyväskylä blueline in the 2016–17 season, appearing in a career high 41 games, in matching his offensive output with 6 points. He registered 3 assists in 14 post-season games before losing in 7 games in the semi-finals to KalPa. On 5 May 2017, Vaakanainen left JYP Jyväskylä after just one season and signed a one-year contract with his third Liiga club, SaiPa. Vaakanainen's progress was recognised as he was drafted in the first-round, 18th overall by the Boston Bruins in the 2017 NHL Entry Draft.

On 13 June 2018, Vaakanainen signed a three-year, entry-level contract with the Bruins. On 20 October, Vaakanainen was called up for the first time from the AHL's Providence Bruins farm team and he made his NHL debut that night in a 2–1 loss to the Vancouver Canucks.

On 19 March 2022, Vaakanainen was involved in a trade by the Bruins that sent him along with John Moore and multiple draft selections to the Anaheim Ducks in exchange for Hampus Lindholm and Kodie Curran. He played the season out on the Ducks blueline, registering 2 assists through 14 games.

On 23 July 2022, Vaakanainen as a restricted free agent was re-signed by the Ducks to a two-year, $1.7 million contract extension. During pre-season for the  season, Vaakanainen was hospitalised after he crashed into the end boards against the San Jose Sharks on September 30, 2022. Missing the first 22 games of the season, Vaakanainen returned to the Ducks after a one game conditioning stint with AHL affilaite, the San Diego Gulls. He made just 23 appearances with the Ducks, posting 2 assists, before suffering a season ending injury on January 28, 2023. He was later announced to have had surgery on a torn labrum in his hip on March 4, 2023, with an expected recovery time of 6 months.

International play

Vaakanainen represented the Finnish under-18 national team in the 2016 IIHF World U18 Championships with whom he won gold medals and then finished in second place in 2017 IIHF World U18 Championships. He then played for the Finnish under-20 national team in 2017 World Junior Ice Hockey Championships and 2018 World Junior Ice Hockey Championships where they finished ninth and sixth respectively. Vaakanainen would finally win gold in the 2019 World Junior Ice Hockey Championships, his third time in the tournament as Team Finland was victorious against Team USA in the gold medal round.

Personal life
Vaakanainen was born in Joensuu. His father Harri Vaakanainen played ice hockey in the Finnish 2. Divisioona, which is the fourth highest level in Finland.

Career statistics

Regular season and playoffs

International

References

External links
 

1999 births
Living people
Anaheim Ducks players
Boston Bruins draft picks
Boston Bruins players
Espoo Blues players
Finnish ice hockey defencemen
JYP-Akatemia players
JYP Jyväskylä players
National Hockey League first-round draft picks
Sportspeople from Jyväskylä
Providence Bruins players
SaiPa players
San Diego Gulls (AHL) players
21st-century Finnish people